Rafael Mir Vicente (born 18 June 1997) is a Spanish professional footballer who plays as a striker for La Liga club Sevilla.

He has played in La Liga for Valencia, Huesca and Sevilla, as well as in the Segunda División for Las Palmas and Huesca. Abroad, he had spells in England with Wolverhampton Wanderers and Nottingham Forest.

Mir won the 2019 European Championship with the Spain national under-21 football team, and a silver medal with the Olympic team at the 2020 tournament.

Club career

Early career
Born in Murcia, Mir began his career playing futsal with CD Javalí Nuevo. After a 120-goal spell at ElPozo Murcia FS he began playing full football with Ranero CF, scoring 57 and 84 goals in his respective seasons before joining FC Barcelona.

Valencia
Mir's 32 goals at La Masia earned him a return to his native region and Real Murcia, where a 45-goal haul led to the attention of Valencia CF. He made his senior debut for the reserves on 1 March 2015, as an 88th-minute substitute for Wilfried Zahibo in a 2–1 Segunda División B loss at CE L'Hospitalet.

Mir scored his first senior goal on 7 March 2015, netting the last in a 2–0 win over CF Badalona at the Ciudad Deportiva de Paterna. He finished the campaign with four appearances, as his side narrowly avoided relegation.

The following season, Mir excelled in the UEFA Youth League, scoring consecutive braces in victories over Gent. On 14 November 2015, he was given his first start for the B-side, playing the full 90 minutes in a 4–2 loss at another reserve team, Villarreal CF B.

On 24 November 2015, Mir was called up to the main squad by manager Nuno Espírito Santo for a La Liga game against UD Las Palmas; he was an unused substitute in the 1–1 draw at the Mestalla Stadium. He made his professional debut on 25 November, starting in a UEFA Champions League group stage match away to Zenit Saint Petersburg, being substituted for Santi Mina in the 56th minute of an eventual 2–0 defeat.

Mir made his top-flight debut against Las Palmas on 28 August 2016, replacing Enzo Pérez for the final four minutes of a 4–2 home loss. He began the first half of the 2017–18 season for Valencia B in good form, scoring 15 goals in 19 games, attracting interest from Real Madrid and Wolverhampton Wanderers.

Wolverhampton Wanderers
On 3 January 2018, Mir joined Championship club Wolverhampton Wanderers for an undisclosed fee, signing a four-and-a-half-year contract with the club and taking the number 9 shirt. He linked up with former Valencia boss Nuno Espírito Santo, who gave him his first team debut at the club. He made his debut three days later in the FA Cup third round at home to Swansea City, playing the last 13 minutes of a goalless draw in place of Léo Bonatini.

On 23 July 2018, Mir joined Segunda División side UD Las Palmas on loan for one season. A year later, he returned to the Championship, on loan to Nottingham Forest. After struggling for both minutes and goals with Forest, Mir and Forest agreed for him to return to his parent club on 14 January 2020.

Immediately following his departure from Nottingham, Mir was loaned to Segunda División side SD Huesca for 18 months. He was sent off on 8 February 2020 in a 1–0 loss at Girona FC for elbowing Álex Granell and banned for one match. On 17 July, he scored twice in a 3–0 home win over CD Numancia to win promotion to the top flight with a game remaining.

On 15 December 2020, Mir scored a hat-trick in a 3–2 extra-time win over CD Marchamalo in the first round of the Copa del Rey. The following 29 January, he netted another treble in a 3–1 victory at Real Valladolid. He ended the league season with 13 goals, joint eighth-best.

Sevilla
On 20 August 2021, Mir signed a six-year contract with Sevilla. On 23 November 2021, he scored his first Champions League goal in the 97th minute of a 2–0 victory over VfL Wolfsburg.

International career 
On 29 June 2021, Mir was named in the 22-man squad for the 2020 Summer Olympics by manager Luis de la Fuente. On 31 July, he scored an injury-time equaliser against the Ivory Coast to take their quarter-final to extra-time, in which he added two further goals to complete a hat-trick as Spain won 5–2 .

Personal life
Mir, who idolised German forward Mario Gómez, is the son of former defender Magín Mir, whose clubs included RCD Mallorca and Murcia.

Career statistics

Club

Honours
Huesca
Segunda División: 2019–20

Spain U21
UEFA European Under-21 Championship: 2019

Spain U23
Summer Olympics Silver Medal: 2020

References

External links
Profile at the Sevilla FC website

1997 births
Living people
Sportspeople from Cartagena, Spain
Footballers from the Region of Murcia
Spanish footballers
Association football midfielders
La Liga players
Segunda División players
Segunda División B players
Valencia CF Mestalla footballers
Valencia CF players
UD Las Palmas players
SD Huesca footballers
Sevilla FC players
English Football League players
Wolverhampton Wanderers F.C. players
Nottingham Forest F.C. players
Spain under-21 international footballers
Spanish expatriate footballers
Spanish expatriate sportspeople in England
Expatriate footballers in England
Olympic footballers of Spain
Footballers at the 2020 Summer Olympics
Olympic medalists in football
Olympic silver medalists for Spain
Medalists at the 2020 Summer Olympics